The Crasna Veche is a tributary of the River Crasna. It is the old lower reach of the Crasna before its channelization and is used at present mainly as a drainage canal. It originates in Romania near the village of Domănești, crosses into Hungary north of Berveni and finally joins the new course of the Crasna near Nagyecsed.

References

Rivers of Romania
Rivers of Hungary
Rivers of Satu Mare County
International rivers of Europe